Patricia Quinn is an American actress.

Biography 
In 1966, Quinn played the female lead as "Cora Ellis", a Quaker who falls in love with Thad (Roger Ewing) in “Quaker Girl” (S12E12) on the TV Western Gunsmoke (credited as Ariane Quinn).

Quinn played the title role of Alice Brock in the 1969 film Alice's Restaurant, which the real Alice Brock disowned after its release. Quinn's other credits included An Unmarried Woman, Shoot Out, Zachariah, Clean and Sober, and Shut Yer Dirty Little Mouth!.

Quinn was married to Tommy Leonetti and John Escobar. She lives in Palmdale, California.

Filmography

Film

Television

References

External links

American film actresses
American television actresses
Living people
1937 births
People from Langhorne, Pennsylvania
Actresses from Pennsylvania
21st-century American women